Joseph M. Murphy (1947 – 6 April 2009) was an Irish hurler who played at club level with Passage and Shamrocks and at inter-county level with the Cork senior hurling team. He usually lined out at centre-back.

Career

Murphy first played hurling at juvenile and underage levels with the Passage club and later became a mainstay of the club's senior team. At inter-county level, he never played at minor level with Cork but was a substitute on the under-21 team that beat Wexford in the 1968 All-Ireland under-21 final. Murphy was subsequently drafted onto the Cork senior hurling team during the team's successful 1968-69 National League campaign. It was the first of two successive league titles as well as consecutive Munster Championship titles. After coming on as a substitute in the 1969 All-Ireland final defeat by Kilkenny, Murphy ended the following season with All-Ireland success after a 6-21 to 5-10 win over Wexford in the 1970 All-Ireland final. He later joined the Shamrocks club and won divisional titles in both hurling and Gaelic football.

Death

Murphy died after a long period of illness on 6 April 2009, aged 71.

Honours

Shamrocks
South East Junior A Football Championship: 1980
South East Junior A Hurling Championship: 1980, 1981

Cork
All-Ireland Senior Hurling Championship: 1970
Munster Senior Hurling Championship: 1969, 1970
National Hurling League: 1968-69, 1969-70
All-Ireland Under-21 Hurling Championship: 1968
Munster Under-21 Hurling Championship: 1968

References

1947 births
2009 deaths
Passage West hurlers
Shamrocks (Cork) hurlers
Shamrocks (Cork) Gaelic footballers
Cork inter-county hurlers